Asturias (F74) is the fourth ship of five Spanish-built s, based on the American  design, of the Spanish Navy.

Laid down in March 1971 and launched on 13 March 1972, Asturias was commissioned into service on 2 December 1975.

All of these Spanish frigates were built to the size of the Knox frigates.

Other units of class 
 
 
 
 

Ships of the Spanish Navy
1972 ships
Baleares-class frigates
Frigates of the Cold War